DelBio Inc. which is a branch biotechnology company belonging to Delta Electronics, has been founded in May 2010 and receives the existing Biomedical products and R&D platforms from Delta Electronics Group. They are an OEM for Omron.

History 
 2005 - Delta group has been investing various resources in biomedical products & its R&D. 
 2010 - DelBio Inc. is founded.
 2010 - Approval by the FDA for 510k

See also
 List of companies of Taiwan

References

External links
 Delta Electronics, INC.
 DELBio,INC.
 DELBio,INC.global link

Taiwanese companies established in 2010